FabricLive.74 is a DJ mix album by English electronic music duo Jack Beats. The album was released as part of the FabricLive Mix Series.

Track listing

References

External links

FabricLive.74 at Fabric

Fabric (club) albums
2014 compilation albums